#O Premave is a 2018 Indian Kannada-language romantic drama film directed by Manoj Kumar and starring himself and Nikki Galrani.

Cast  
Manoj Kumar as Rahul
Nikki Galrani as Anjali
Apoorva
Rangayana Raghu
Sadhu Kokila
Prashanth Siddi
Huccha Venkat in a cameo appearance

Production 
The film is directed by Manoj Kumar, who starred in Moggina Manasu. The film is based on a true story. The film was shot in Bengaluru, Mangalore, Mysore, and the song "Gari Gedari" was shot in Switzerland. Nikki Galrani, who was last seen in Kanna with the film Sidhartha, portrays the lead actress.  Femina Miss India 2016 South finalist Apoorva Rai was signed to play a role in the film.

Soundtrack 
The songs were composed by Anand Rajavikram and Rahul Dev.

Reception 
The Times of India gave the film two out of five stars and wrote that "This film can be a choice for those who want an old-fashioned love story, with the hero being the one who uploads all things idealistic". The News Minute wrote that "At the end of the day, if you’re looking for a well-crafted romance with relatable characters, #O Premave is not it".

References 

2018 romantic drama films
Indian romantic drama films
 Films shot in Bangalore
 Films shot in Mangalore
 Films shot in Mysore
Films shot in Switzerland